Roncaglia  is a surname of Italian origin. People with that name include:

 Alessandro Roncaglia (born 1947), Italian economist
 Facundo Roncaglia (born 1987), Argentine football defender
 Francesco Roncaglia (c. 1750-after 1812), Italian soprano castrato who was a primo in London in the 1780s, see Giovanni Ansani
 Luigi Roncaglia (born 1943), Italian cyclist

See also

 Roncaglia (disambiguation)

Surnames of Italian origin